Juho Malkamäki (23 May 1844 – 13 January 1928) was a Finnish farmer, lay preacher and politician, born in Ylistaro. He was a member of the Diet of Finland in 1888 and of the Parliament of Finland from 1909 to 1911, representing the Finnish Party.

References

1844 births
1928 deaths
People from Seinäjoki
People from Vaasa Province (Grand Duchy of Finland)
Finnish Lutherans
Finnish Party politicians
Members of the Parliament of Finland (1909–10)
Members of the Parliament of Finland (1910–11)